Buguias, officially the Municipality of Buguias, , is a 3rd class municipality in the province of Benguet, Philippines. According to the 2020 census, it has a population of 44,877 people. The municipality is home to the mummy of Apo Anno, one of the most revered and important folk hero in Benguet prior to Spanish arrival.

Etymology
According to folklore, Buguias got its name from the word bugas (or begas) which means "rice".

Another version of its origin would be an Igorot settlement during the pre-Spanish time called Bogey-yas, which was modernized and spelled as Buguias by Spanish authorities.

History

Pre-colonial era
Nabalicong village in Barangay Natubleng was the center of the area's cultural and political domains prior to Spanish colonization. In the 12th century, a folk hero, known as Apo Anno, lived with the people of the area and was a spiritual leader, hunter, and demigod. The people believed Apo Anno was a son of a Benguet goddess. His body was filled with tattoos, symbolizing his high status in the community. During his protectorate of the domain, prosperity spurred. He died before the arrival of the Spaniards, and thus, was given mummification and death rites in the traditional way.

Spanish period
The arrival of Spanish colonizers in Buguias were primarily due to the construction of Spanish trails leading to the mountain region. Buguias and Loo were two separate rancherias during the Spanish Regime.

American period
During the American rule, Buguias was established as one of the 19 townships of the province of Benguet, upon the issuance of Act No. 48 by the Philippine Commission on November 22, 1900.

On November 23, 1900, the township of Loo was abolished and integrated into the township of Buguias with the issuance of Act No. 49. On August 13, 1908, Benguet was established as a sub-province of the newly created Mountain Province with the enactment of  Act No. 1876. As a result, six townships of Benguet were abolished, but Buguias remained a constituent town of Benguet sub-province.

In 1918, the mummy of Apo Anno was stolen by foreign treasure hunters. An earthquake and pestilence followed afterwards, prompting the people to campaign for the return of Apo Anno to his resting place.

Post-war era
On June 25, 1963, President Diosdado Macapagal issued Executive Order No. 42 converting eight (8) of the thirteen (13) towns (designated as municipal districts) of Benguet sub-province into regular municipalities. Buguias was among them.

On June 18, 1966, the sub-province of Benguet was separated from the old Mountain Province and was converted into a regular province. Buguias remained to be a component municipality of the newly established province.

Contemporary era

In 1984, a Filipino antique collector bought an auctioned mummy, only to discover it was the mummy of Apo Anno. He donated it to the National Museum of the Philippines afterwards for better care of the national treasure. The people of Buguias made diplomatic channels with the National Museum until it was agreed that the National Museum would return the mummy of Apo Anno to its resting place in barangay Nabalicong after Benguet officials agreed to install iron grills in the burial cave and provide funds for its upkeep. Later that year, Apo Anno was returned to its burial cave, through elaborate death rituals last performed in the 16th century and a hero's homecoming conducted by the people of Buguias.

There have been scholars campaigning for the declaration of Apo Anno's mummy and resting place as a collective National Treasure or Important Cultural Property of the Philippines.

Geography
It is bounded by Mankayan on the north-west, Bakun on the mid-west, Kibungan on the south-west, Kabayan on the south, Tinoc on the east, Hungduan on the north-east, and Bauko on the north.

According to the Philippine Statistics Authority, the municipality has a land area of  constituting  of the  total area of Benguet.

Barangays
Buguias is politically subdivided into 14 barangays. These barangays are headed by elected officials: Barangay Captain, Barangay Council, whose members are called Barangay Councilors. All are elected every three years.

Climate

Demographics

In the 2020 census, Buguias had a population of 44,877.

Economy 

Buguias is primarily an agricultural town. It is one of the leading producers of highland vegetables, especially carrots, in the province of Benguet.

Most of the vegetables produced in the town are sold at the La Trinidad Vegetable Trading Post or are marketed to other parts of the country.

Government
Buguias, belonging to the lone congressional district of the province of Benguet, is governed by a mayor designated as its local chief executive and by a municipal council as its legislative body in accordance with the Local Government Code. The mayor, vice mayor, and the councilors are elected directly by the people through an election which is being held every three years.

Elected officials

Education

Public schools
As of 2014, Buguias has 43 public elementary schools and 6 public secondary schools.

Historical markers and shrine

Veteran Memorial Marker
The Veteran Memorial Marker marks the liberation of Abatan and Buguias on July 27, 1945, that was fought between the Japanese Imperial Army and the combined Filipino and American ground troops. Through municipal council resolution No. 19, July 27, 1945, was declared as the Liberation Day and local holiday in the municipality. Festivals during this date include parades, programs and wreath-laying.

World War II 66th Infantry Shrine
The World War II 66th Infantry Shrine monument, located in Lengaoan along Halsema Highway, symbolizes the bravery of the combined Filipino and American soldiers who stood their ground defending the area and firing their cannons against the Japanese forces.

Burial Site of Apo Anno
The 12th century burial site, which was later used again for Apo Anno's reburial in 1999, is one of the most important cultural sites in Benguet. The burial site is home to the mummy of one of Benguet's folk heroes whose remains are still preserved in present time.

Notes

References

External links
 [ Philippine Standard Geographic Code]

Municipalities of Benguet
Populated places on the Agno River